Kittisol is an obsolete Indian-English term from the 19th Century for paper umbrellas, and rain-cloaks, made of oiled paper, afterwards varnished. They were made in China or Japan, and the name may have originated in the Portuguese quita-sol, meaning "excluding the sun", for parasol. In India, the term extended to the men who acted as umbrella bearers for important persons.

In a treaty with China in 1844, the United States agreed a tariff of 5 mace per 100 catties on exports of kittisols to the United States.

Citations and references
Citations

References
Hildreth, Richard (1860) Japan and the Japanese. (Bradley, Dayton).
Irish traveller (1835) Autobiography of an Irish traveller. 
Public Statutes at Large of the United States of America, Volume 8 (1867). (Charle C. Little and James Brown).

Umbrellas
Fashion accessories
Protective gear
Rain